Neelakanta is a 2006 Indian Kannada language romantic drama film directed by Om Sai Prakash, produced by K. Bala Mutthaiah, and starring V. Ravichandran, Namitha and Sridevika. It is a remake of the Tamil film Aranmanai Kili (1993) directed and written by Rajkiran. The music was composed by V. Ravichandran.

The film was dubbed in Tamil and released as Brahmandam.

Cast 
 V. Ravichandran as Neelakanta
 Namitha 
 Sridevika
 Sujatha 
 Umashri
 Avinash
 Lamboo Nagesh
 Kashi
 Sadhu Kokila
 Ramesh Bhat
 M.N Lakshmi Devi
 Vijay Kashi
 Ashalatha
 Muniraj

Plot 
The film has the shades of his film 'Usire' and a Telugu film. Yet the film is tolerable because of the light up moment of glitz and glamour the mainstay of all Ravichandran films.

Just as lord Shiva swallows the fearful poison Halahala and, with the help of his wife Parvati, neutralises it in his throat, so the protagonist of 'Neelakanta' swallows all the difficulties that beset him on his way, in order to remain obedient to his Master, his Mother and his wife, Madadhi. Neelakanta can give solution to any problems of his surroundings but he goes blank for his own problems. His mother disagrees to his accidental marriage and asks him not to see her face. On the other hand, his wife on compulsion suspects Neelanakanta to the extreme. That is because of Ganga in the house who has been brought to the house in her most difficult condition by Neelakanta. With no happiness around for him Neelakanta problems slowly dilute when his mother narrate the past of Neelakanta's master. How his wife Ganga change her track, what happens to Gowri, the sad end of mother and Neelakanta not able to see his mother, the putting down of goons in the meantime are all the remaining portions in the second half.

Soundtrack 
The music was composed and lyrics written by V. Ravichandran. A total of 6 tracks have been composed for the film and the audio rights brought by Jhankar Music.

References

External links 

 Neelakanta Review

2006 films
2000s Kannada-language films
Indian drama films
Kannada remakes of Tamil films
Films directed by Sai Prakash
Films scored by V. Ravichandran